The shyuvr or shuvyr (chiabour in French sources) is a type of bagpipe of the Mari people, a Volga-Finnic people living in the Mari El Republic of central-western Russia. It is described as small bagpipe, consisting of a bag, a bone blowpipe, and two tubes of tin joined by a wooden sheath. The pipe is almost always played with the tumyr, a Mari drum.

An 1892 French work noted that the Mari had developed three instruments: a cithare (zither or cittern), bagpipe, and drum. A later English work makes a similar statement, saying that the Mari have two instruments unique to their culture: the kusle mult-stringed zither, and the shyuvr bagpipe.

References

Volga Finns
Mari musical instruments
Bagpipes